Silviu Olteanu (born January 20, 1978) is a Romanian professional boxer living and fighting out of Madrid, Spain. He is a former EBU (European) Flyweight champion until he vacated the title in July 2013.

Professional career
Olteanu fought for the WBA World Flyweight title in December 2010 in Japan, losing in a split decision (113-115, 112-116, 118-110) against the champion Daiki Kameda.

Professional boxing record

|-
|align="center" colspan=8|16 Wins (7 knockouts, 9 decisions), 12 Losses, 1 Draw 
|-
|align=center style="border-style: none none solid solid; background: #e3e3e3"|Res.
|align=center style="border-style: none none solid solid; background: #e3e3e3"|Record
|align=center style="border-style: none none solid solid; background: #e3e3e3"|Opponent
|align=center style="border-style: none none solid solid; background: #e3e3e3"|Type
|align=center style="border-style: none none solid solid; background: #e3e3e3"|Rd., Time
|align=center style="border-style: none none solid solid; background: #e3e3e3"|Date
|align=center style="border-style: none none solid solid; background: #e3e3e3"|Location
|align=center style="border-style: none none solid solid; background: #e3e3e3"|Notes
|- align=center
|Loss
|16-12-1
|align=left| Paddy Barnes
| MD || 10
|2017-06-17
|align=left| Waterfront Hall, Belfast
|align=left|
|-align=center
|Loss
|16-11-1
|align=left| Mohammed Obbadi
| MD || 12
|2016-11-19
|align=left| Palasport, Manzano
|align=left|
|-align=center
|Loss
|16-10-1
|align=left| Artem Dalakian
| TKO || 8 
|2016-05-14
|align=left| Parkovy Convention Centre, Kiev
|align=left|
|-align=center
|Win
|16-9-1
|align=left| Ricardo Tanase
| KO || 1 
|2016-04-23
|align=left| Gimnasio del Rayo Vallecano, Madrid
|align=left|
|-align=center
|Loss
|15-9-1
|align=left| Paul Butler
| TKO || 6 
|2015-12-19
|align=left| Manchester Arena (formerly M.E.N Arena), Manchester
|align=left|
|-align=center
|Loss
|15-8-1
|align=left| Thomas Masson
| UD || 12
|2015-09-12
|align=left| Pas-de-Calais
|align=left|
|-align=center
|Win
|15-7-1
|align=left| Giuseppe Lagana
| UD || 6
|2015-03-07 || align=left| Community of Madrid
|align=left|
|-align=center
|Loss
|14-7-1
|align=left| Armando Santos
| MD || 12
|2014-02-01 || align=left| Mexico City
|align=left|
|-align=center
|Win
|14-6-1
|align=left| Andrea Sarritzu 
| SD || 12 
|2012-10-20 || align=left| Santa Teresa Gallura
|align=left|
|-align=center
|Win
|13-6-1
|align=left| Giuseppe Lagana 
| TKO || 5 
|2012-05-25 || align=left| Montefiascone
|align=left|
|-align=center
|Win
|12-6-1
|align=left| Valery Yanchy
| SD || 12 
|2012-03-09 || align=left| A Coruña
|align=left|
|-align=center
|style="background:#abcdef;"|Draw
|11-6-1
|align=left| Valery Yanchy
| MD || 12 
|2011-10-07 || align=left| A Coruña
|align=left|
|-align=center
|Loss
|11-6
|align=left| Xavi Urpi 
| PTS || 8 
|2011-05-27 || align=left| Castellbisbal
|align=left|
|-align=center
|Loss
|11-5
|align=left| Wilbert Uicab 
| MD || 12 
|2011-04-02 || align=left| Playa del Carmen
|align=left|
|-align=center
|Loss
|11-4
|align=left| Daiki Kameda
| SD || 12 
|2010-12-26 || align=left| Saitama
|align=left|
|-align=center
|Win
|11-3
|align=left| Bernard Inom
| UD || 12 
|2010-05-15 || align=left| Leganés
|align=left|
|-align=center
|Win
|10-3
|align=left| Alain Bonnel 
| UD || 12 
|2009-12-19 || align=left| Madrid
|align=left|
|-align=center
|Win
|9-3
|align=left| Janko Janev 
| TKO || 2 
|2009-04-04 || align=left| Leganés
|align=left|
|-align=center
|Win
|8-3
|align=left| Julio Vargas 
| UD || 6
|2008-12-12 || align=left| Castellbisbal
|align=left|
|-align=center
|Win
|7-3
|align=left| Dimitar Alipiev 
| TKO || 3 
|2008-05-17 || align=left| Fuenlabrada
|align=left|
|-align=center
|Win
|6-3
|align=left| Christian Ferchi 
| TKO || 1 
|2008-04-04 || align=left| San Sebastián de los Reyes
|align=left|
|-align=center
|Win
|5-3
|align=left| Jordi Gallart 
| PTS || 6
|2007-11-24 || align=left| Madrid
|align=left|
|-align=center
|Win
|4-3
|align=left| Joan Josep Gallart 
| TKO || 2 
|2007-05-19 || align=left| Madrid
|align=left|
|-align=center
|Win
|3-3
|align=left| Bogdan Condurache 
| RTD || 5 
|2006-09-09 || align=left| La Muela
|align=left|
|-align=center
|Win
|2-3
|align=left| Jordi Gallart 
| PTS || 4
|2006-08-20 || align=left| El Prat de Llobregat
|align=left|
|-align=center
|Win
|1-3
|align=left| Carlos Ruiz 
| UD || 4 
|2006-03-11 || align=left| Móstoles
|align=left|
|-align=center
|Loss
|0-3
|align=left| Valeri Yanchi 
| PTS || 4 
|2005-03-12 || align=left| Narón
|align=left|
|-align=center
|Loss
|0-2
|align=left| Giovanni Jaramillo 
| PTS || 4 
|2005-02-04 || align=left| Alcalá de Henares
|align=left|
|-align=center
|Loss
|0-1
|align=left| Valeri Yanchi 
| PTS || 6 
|2005-01-07 || align=left| Lugo
|align=left|
|-align=center

References

External links 

Flyweight boxers
Romanian emigrants to Spain
Romanian expatriate sportspeople in Spain
1978 births
Living people
Romanian male boxers